Ruben Matias Cayari (July 25, 1923 – April 7, 1994), professionally known as Ruben Rustia, was a Filipino actor and screenwriter. He is best known for his portrayal of President Ferdinand Marcos in the 1988 Australian miniseries A Dangerous Life.

He won the FAMAS Award for Best Supporting Actor for his performance in the 1954 fantasy film Pedro Penduko, and was later nominated for four more times in the same category as well as for Best Actor and Best Screenplay.

Career
Ruben Rustia began his film career as an extra in the 1947 film Kamay ng Diyos (English: 'Hand of God'). His first supporting role was in the 1951 film Taga-Ilog, and would later receive a reputation as a character actor.

In 1988, Rustia was cast in the role of President Ferdinand Marcos in the Australian miniseries A Dangerous Life (or The Four Day Revolution in Australia). Karla Delgado of the Manila Standard praised his performance as the president, stating that he "has Marcos' voice and mannerisms perfected."

In 1993, he performed as Kapitan Tiago in Eddie Romero's miniseries adaptation of José Rizal's novel Noli Me Tángere.

Personal life
Rustia had six children with his wife Alejandra. He was a Methodist.

Filmography

Film

Television

References

1923 births
1994 deaths
20th-century Filipino male actors
Filipino screenwriters
20th-century screenwriters